Mannagudda is a locality in Mangalore city of Karnataka state in India.

References 

Localities in Mangalore